Rutilio del Riego Jáñez (born September 21, 1940) is a Spanish-born American prelate of the Roman Catholic Church. Del Riego Jáñez served as an auxiliary bishop for the Diocese of San Bernardino in California from 2005 to 2015.

Biography

Early life 
Born in Valdesandinas, Spain on September 21, 1940, del Riego Jáñez joined the Fraternity of diocesan worker priests of the Sacred Heart of Jesus in 1961.  He studied theology at the Pontifical University of Salamanca in Spain, then went to Washington, D.C. to attend Catholic University of America. He received a licentiate and a Master of Arts degree from Catholic University.

Priesthood 
On June 5, 1965, del Riego Jáñez was ordained into the priesthood by Auxiliary Bishop William McDonald at the Basilica of the National Shrine of the Immaculate Conception in Washington, D.C.

After his ordination, del Riego Jáñez, served as an instructor at Saint Vincent College in Latrobe, Pennsylvania and director of the Office of Vocations at the Northeast Catholic Pastoral Center in New York City.  While in Washington, he headed the Spanish Catholic Center, was associate director of the Sol Vocational Institute and director of the diocesan Laborer Priests House of Formation. Del Riego Jáñez also served as delegate for the United States for the Diocesan Laborer Priests.

In Texas, del Riego Jáñez served as director of the Office of Vocations at the Mexican American Cultural Center in San Antonio; and pastor of Santa Lucia Parish and San Antonio de Padua Parish, both in El Paso, Texas.

In 1999, del Riego Jáñez moved to the Diocese of San Bernardino.  He served as parochial vicar and pastor at Our Lady of Perpetual Help Parish in Riverside, California. He also served as vicar forane for the Riverside Vicariate and as a member of the Presbyteral Council.

Auxiliary Bishop of San Bernardino 
On June 26, 2005, del Riego Jáñez was appointed titular bishop of Daimlaig and auxiliary bishop of the Diocese of San Bernardino by Pope Benedict XVI.  He was consecrated on September 20, 2005, by Bishop Gerald Barnes at Saint Paul the Apostle Catholic Church in Chino Hills, California.

On December 11, 2015, Pope Francis accepted del Riego Jáñez's letter of resignation as auxiliary bishop of the Diocese of San Bernardino.

References

External links
 Roman Catholic Diocese of San Bernardino Official Site

 

1940 births
Living people
People from León, Spain
Spanish Roman Catholic titular bishops
Spanish Roman Catholic bishops in North America
Del Riego Janez, Rutilio
Spanish emigrants to the United States